Subtropics is an American literary journal based at the University of Florida in Gainesville.

Works originally published in Subtropics have been subsequently selected for inclusion in the Best American Poetry, The Best American Short Stories, Best American Nonrequired Reading, New Stories from the Midwest, New Stories from the South, the O. Henry Prize anthology, and the Pushcart Prize anthology.

Notable writers who have contributed to this journal include Seth Abramson, Steve Almond, Chris Bachelder, John Barth, Harold Bloom, Peter Cameron, Anne Carson, Billy Collins, Martha Collins, Mark Doty, Lauren Groff, Allan Gurganus, Amy Hempel, Bob Hicok, Roy Kesey, J. M. G. Le Clézio, Les Murray, Edna O'Brien, Lucia Perillo, D. A. Powell, Padgett Powell, A. E. Stallings, Olga Slavnikova, Ben Sonnenberg, Peter Stamm, Terese Svoboda, and Paul Theroux.

Background information

Subtropics was founded in 2006, and is the official literary magazine of the University of Florida. The predecessor to Subtropics was The Florida Quarterly, and this publication was stopped many years ago.

Subtropics is published twice a year, and is under the jurisdiction of the English Department, which is part of the larger University of Florida College of Liberal Arts and Sciences.

See also
University of Florida
University of Florida College of Liberal Arts and Sciences
List of literary magazines

References

External links
Subtropics website
Evaluation of the publication
UF College of Liberal Arts & Sciences discusses Subtropics
Winningwriters.com Info
Additional evaluation

Poetry magazines published in the United States
Biannual magazines published in the United States
Magazines established in 2006
Magazines published in Florida
University of Florida
2006 establishments in Florida